Ayana is a 2017 Kanglish film directed by Gangadhar Salimath. The film is set in Bengaluru and features newcomers.

Cast 
Deepak Subramanya as Aditya Adi
 Apoorva Soma
Karthik
Ramesh Bhat
Sriharsha
Goutham
Vedashree
Nagashree Moksha

Production 
The cast and crew are debutantes who worked in a technology company.

Reception 
Sunayana Suresh of The Times of India said that "What works for Ayana is that it is fresh and has certain scenes that are beautifully shot. The flipside to this is that the film  mainly newcomers and some of the crucial scenes end up coming across as rehearsed and not too natural, which brings down the realistic treatment that the cinema aims to show". A. Sharadhaa of The New Indian Express opined that "The story is fresh, but unfortunately the film fails in its screenplay. The first half is dull even when there was scope for creative storytelling, but the second half adds more weight to the narrative".

Home media
The film is available on Netflix.

Accolades 
Karnataka State Film Awards
First Best Director

References